The 2021 iHeartRadio Music Awards were held at the Dolby Theatre in Los Angeles on May 27, 2021, and was broadcast live on Fox. Usher hosted the ceremony.

Performances
Performers were announced on May 11, 2021, through the iHeartRadio website.

Winners and nominees
iHeartRadio announced the nominees on April 7, 2021.

Winners are listed first and in bold

References

2021
2021 music awards
2021 in Los Angeles
2021 awards in the United States
March 2021 events in the United States